Ring finger protein 103 is a protein that in humans is encoded by the RNF103 gene.

Function

The protein encoded by this gene contains a RING-H2 finger, a motif known to be involved in protein-protein and protein-DNA interactions. This gene is highly expressed in normal cerebellum, but not in the cerebral cortex. The expression of the rat counterpart in the frontal cortex and hippocampus was shown to be induced by electroconvulsive treatment (ECT) as well as chronic antidepressant treatment, suggesting that this gene may be a molecular target for ECT and antidepressants. The protein is a ubiquitin ligase that functions in the endoplasmic reticulum-associated degradation pathway. Alternative splicing of this gene results in multiple transcript variants. Read-through transcription also exists between this gene and the downstream CHMP3 (charged multivesicular body protein 3) gene.

References

Further reading